Orlando Samuell (born 31 December 1946) is a Cuban volleyball player. He competed in the men's tournament at the 1972 Summer Olympics. As well as competing at the Olympics, he won medals with the Cuban team at the Pan American Games, including bronze in 1967, and gold medals at the 1971 and 1975 games. Following his career as a player, he also coached the Cuban men's team at the 2011 FIVB Volleyball Men's World Cup.

References

1946 births
Living people
Cuban men's volleyball players
Olympic volleyball players of Cuba
Volleyball players at the 1972 Summer Olympics
Place of birth missing (living people)
Pan American Games medalists in volleyball
Pan American Games gold medalists for Cuba
Pan American Games bronze medalists for Cuba
Volleyball players at the 1971 Pan American Games
Volleyball players at the 1967 Pan American Games
Volleyball players at the 1975 Pan American Games
Medalists at the 1967 Pan American Games
Medalists at the 1971 Pan American Games
Medalists at the 1975 Pan American Games